Team K (TK), named Team Köllensperger from its establishment in July 2018 to November 2019, is an Italian regionalist and liberal political party active in South Tyrol, where it seeks to be an inter-ethnic centrist party. Its leader is Paul Köllensperger.

TK advocates direct democracy, social liberalism and environmentalist policies. 

The party, which is close to NEOS, a liberal party in Austria, is an observer member of the Alliance of Liberals and Democrats for Europe Party and, more recently, has formed a pact with More Europe for the 2019 European Parliament election.

History
The party was established on the 10 July 2018 by Paul Köllensperger, a member of the Landtag of South Tyrol. Köllensperger was elected in the Landtag after the 2013 provincial election, within the Five Star Movement (M5S). However, in July 2018, he left the party accusing its leadership of not being interested in promoting enough South Tyrol’s local interests and that it was necessary to establish a new party aimed at representing all the South Tyroleans looking for an inter-ethnic centrist party and aiming at breaking the absolute majority of the South Tyrolean People's Party (SVP). 

In the 2018 provincial election the party obtained a successful 15.2% of the vote, arriving second after the SVP.

In the run-up to the 2019 European Parliament election TK, which affirmed to be taking inspiration from Austria's NEOS party, joined the Alliance of Liberals and Democrats for Europe Party (ALDE Party). Consequently, it formed a pact with More Europe (+E), ALDE's member party in Italy, and proposed Renate Holzeisen as its candidate. The list came third with 11.2% of the vote in South Tyrol and Holzeisen was the second most-voted candidate in the province, gaining nearly 23,000 votes, but she did not succeed in being elected as the list did not pass the 4% country-level electoral threshold. Holzeisen later left the party and focused on opposing COVID-19 vaccines.

Election results

Provincial Council

European Parliament

Leadership
Leader: Paul Köllensperger (2018–present)

References

2018 establishments in Italy
Alliance of Liberals and Democrats for Europe Party member parties
Five Star Movement breakaway groups
Liberal parties in Italy
Political parties established in 2018
Political parties in South Tyrol
Political parties of minorities
Pro-European political parties in Italy
Regionalist parties in Italy
Social liberal parties